Hughes Ministry may refer to:

 First Hughes Ministry
 Second Hughes Ministry
 Third Hughes Ministry
 Fourth Hughes Ministry
 Fifth Hughes Ministry